The Opera Theatre of Lucca is an opera and music school and summer music festival in Lucca, Italy.  Founded in 1996 by the late American opera singer and voice teacher Lorenzo Malfatti and British opera director Malcolm Fraser, it is jointly sponsored by the City of Lucca and the University of Cincinnati College-Conservatory of Music. Opera performances and recitals take place in the cloisters, churches, piazzas in and around Lucca as well as in the city's Teatro del Giglio.

References
Gelfand, Janelle, CCM opera chief ends 'adventurous journey' , The Cincinnati Enquirer, September 22, 2002.
Holland, Bernard, Intimacy, if Not Fire, in Tuscany, New York Times, October 13, 1999
Holland, Bernard, Struggling To Make Do Off the Dole, New York Times, October 10, 1999
Wilson, Annasue McCleave, Puccini's Stage: All of Lucca, New York Times, March 15, 1998

External links
The Opera Theatre of Lucca Official site

Music schools in Italy
Opera festivals